Agrium was a major retail supplier of agricultural products and services in North America, South America and Australia and a wholesale producer and marketer of all three major agricultural nutrients and a supplier of specialty fertilizers in North America.

In 2018, Agrium merged with PotashCorp to form Nutrien.

History

Agrium was founded as Cominco Fertilizers (short for Consolidated Mining and Smelting Company) in 1931 and changed its name to Agrium in 1995. Agrium was headquartered in Calgary, Alberta, Canada.  Crop Production Services, Inc., a subsidiary company, was based in Loveland, Colorado and was the location of Agrium's Retail Business Unit head office. The company was a part-owner of Canpotex, which manages all potash exporting from Saskatchewan.

On September 12, 2016, Agrium announced that it had agreed to merge with PotashCorp, which will make the combined company, Nutrien, the largest producer of potash and second-largest producer of nitrogen fertilizer worldwide. Agrium divested certain U.S. assets.  The merger closed on January 1, 2018.

Business units

Agrium operated in two business segments:

Retail

Agrium operated close to 1,500 retail agricultural centres in the U.S., Canada, South America and Australia under the brand names Crop Production Services (CPS), Crop Production Services Canada (CPSC), Agroservicios Pampeanos S.A. and Landmark. Crop Production Services was acquired in 1994.

On December 3, 2010 Agrium announced the completion of the acquisition of the Australian Wheat Board for a total acquisition price of $1.236-billion Australian dollars. This acquisition added to the retail division of Agrium. Roughly 40% of the AWB holdings were sold to Cargill, including the Commodity Management Business.

In October 2013, Agrium announced the acquisition of Viterra's Canadian retail assets, after previously acquiring Viterra's retail locations in Australia.

Wholesale

The Wholesale segment produced nitrogen, phosphate, potash, and sulphur-based fertilizers. This segment also owned and operated a potash mine and production facility in the Rural Municipality of Vanscoy No. 345 in Saskatchewan, Canada, and a phosphate mine in Conda, Idaho, U.S.

The Wholesale segment engaged in the ownership of nitrogen-based fertilizer plants in Bahía Blanca,  Argentina, and in Damietta, Egypt.

Environmental and social impacts
In 2003, Agrium was issued an administrative compliance order for excessive emissions at a Kennewick, Washington plant.  Agrium discovered the violations at the Kennewick facility through a comprehensive Clean Air Act audit of the facility in late 2000. Agrium promptly reported the audit findings to EPA under EPA's policy on Incentives for Self-Policing, also referred to as the "Self-Disclosure Policy". In 2005, Agrium was fined for failure to disclose release of toxic gases at this same plant.

References

External links

 Official site

Companies based in Calgary
Chemical companies established in 1931
Fertilizer companies of Canada
Grain industry of Australia
Retail companies established in 1931
Retail companies disestablished in 2017
1931 establishments in Alberta
2017 disestablishments in Alberta
Stock and station agencies
Companies formerly listed on the Toronto Stock Exchange
Companies formerly listed on the New York Stock Exchange
Agriculture companies established in 1931